Parapadsorn Vorrasirinda (Thai:ปรภัสสร วรสิรินดา, born December 10, 1990), is a Thai beauty queen. Her nickname is Pla (Thai: ปลา).

Biography
She is from Nakhon Ratchasima province, Thailand. She attended Rangsit University, majoring in Marketing Communications. She started competing in beauty contests when she was 19. She finished Top 10 in Thailand Supermodel Contest and Top 10 in Miss Thailand World before winning Miss Grand Thailand.

Miss Grand Thailand 2014
In June 2014, she won the Miss Grand Thailand 2014 pageant. In October 2014, she appeared in the Miss Grand International 2014 pageant, and finished in the Top 10.

Miss Supranational 2014
After the resignation of Miss Supranational Thailand 2014, Parapadsorn Disdamrong was substituted as Thailand's representative at the Miss Supranational 2014 pageant which happened at the Hall of Sport in Krynica-Zdrój, Poland, on December 5, 2014. She was the first runner-up among 70 contestants from around the world, finishing behind Asha Bhat from India.

References

External links
 Parapadsorn Disdamrong (Pla) - Miss Grand Thailand 2014

Living people
Parapadsorn Vorrasirinda
1990 births
Parapadsorn Vorrasirinda
Parapadsorn Vorrasirinda
Miss Supranational contestants
Miss Grand International contestants